Forbes House is a Grade II listed house at 10 Halkin Street, Belgravia, London SW1.

History
It was built in the early-mid 19th century, and was originally called Mortimer House after Edward Harley, 3rd Earl of Oxford and Earl Mortimer, for whom the house was built.

It is named after Bernard Forbes, 8th Earl of Granard and his wife Beatrice Forbes, Countess of Granard, who had it as their principal residence.

Forbes House was used to depict an Eastern European embassy, and Doris Day sang "Que Sera Sera" in the ballroom, in Alfred Hitchcock's film, The Man Who Knew Too Much.

For over 50 years until 2010, it was the headquarters of the Society of Motor Manufacturers and Traders. In 2010, the remaining 47-year lease was sold for about £40 million. 
In 2012, The Guardian reported that it had been bought by David and Frederick Barclay through "offshore entities in Jersey and the British Virgin Islands (BVI)", and that they had spent £48 million, and the house would provide a London base for Sir David Barclay's son, Aidan Barclay. Forbes House was bought by Forbes House Ltd, registered in the BVI with a £48m loan, and a subsidiary company, the Jersey-registered Halkin St Development Ltd has made the appropriate planning applications to convert it back into a single home.

Notable residents
Notable residents of Forbes House have included the Earl of Oxford and Earl Mortimer in the early to mid-19th century, and Edward Douglas-Pennant, 1st Baron Penrhyn from 1860.

References

Belgravia
Grade II listed houses in the City of Westminster
Houses completed in the 19th century